Bal kavita are poems written for children in Hindi.

See also 

 Hindi literature

Hindi-language literature